Act of Faith  is the fourth studio album by the American band Mucky Pup. It was released in 1992.

It was the last studio album to feature founding member and guitarist Dan Nastasi. It features the debuts of bassist Christopher "Junior" LaPlante and keyboardist Kevin Powers. A video was shot for the song "Mr. Hand."

Critical reception

The Toronto Star noted that the band "gnaw away at hardcore, power pop an the heavier end of psychedelia and don't shy from tossing samples and snatches from instruments other than the basic guitars, bass and drums into the mix."

Tracks
Freakin' at the Peepshow 4:31
Mr. Hand 2:46
Understand 3:02
Please Don't Burn The Johnson 2:57
I Am 4:11
Summertime 3:21
Gotta Go 3:52
Angry Song 4:49
Mucky Pumpin' Motion 2:44
The Skinheads Broke My Walkman 2:18
Blowtorch 3:36
Lonely As Me 3:18

Personnel
Chris Milnes – Vocals
John Milnes – Drums
Dan Nastasi – Guitar
Christopher "Junior" LaPlante – Bass
Kevin Powers – Keys

References

External links
MuckyPup.com : Discography

Mucky Pup albums
1992 albums
Century Media Records albums